Knyazhaya Guba is a rural locality (a Selo) in Kandalakshskiy District of Murmansk Oblast, Russia. The village is located beyond the Arctic circle, on the Kola Peninsula. It is 53 m above sea level.

References

Rural localities in Murmansk Oblast
Kandalakshsky District